Facundo Bagnis won his 7th career ATP Challenger Tour title, beating Guilherme Clezar 6–4, 4–6, 6–2

Seeds

Draw

Finals

Top half

Bottom half

References
 Main Draw
 Qualifying Draw

Vivo Tennis Cup - Singles